Kosmos 668 ( meaning Cosmos 668), also known as DS-P1-Yu No.74, was a Soviet satellite which was launched in 1974 as part of the Dnepropetrovsk Sputnik programme. It was a  spacecraft, which was built by the Yuzhnoye Design Bureau, and was used as a radar calibration target for anti-ballistic missile tests.

The launch of Kosmos 668 took place from Site 133/1 at the Plesetsk Cosmodrome, and used a Kosmos-2I 63SM carrier rocket. It occurred at 12:00 UTC on 25 July 1974, and resulted in the satellite successfully reaching low Earth orbit. Upon reaching orbit, the satellite was assigned its Kosmos designation, and received the International Designator 1974-058A. The North American Aerospace Defense Command assigned it the catalogue number 07385.

Kosmos 668 was the seventy-first of seventy nine DS-P1-Yu satellites to be launched, and the sixty-fourth of seventy two to successfully reach orbit. It remained in orbit until it decayed and reentered the atmosphere on 21 February 1975.

See also

1974 in spaceflight

References

1974 in spaceflight
Kosmos satellites
Spacecraft launched in 1974
Dnepropetrovsk Sputnik program